Clayton County Courthouse may refer to:

Clayton County Courthouse (Georgia), Jonesboro, Georgia
Clayton County Courthouse (Iowa), Elkader, Iowa